Carlos Mendy (1929-2002) is a Uruguayan-born stage, film and television actor. He first moved to Argentina and then on to Spain where he enjoyed his greatest success. He is sometimes credited as Carlos Mendi.

Selected filmography
 Back to the Door (1959)
 Taxi for Tobruk (1961)
 Mathias Sandorf (1963)
 The Blackmailers (1963)
 Currito of the Cross (1965)

References

Bibliography
 Florentino Soria. José María Forqué. Editora Regional de Murcia, 1990.

External links

1929 births
2002 deaths
Spanish male film actors
Spanish male stage actors
Spanish people of Uruguayan descent
Uruguayan male film actors
Uruguayan male stage actors
Uruguayan expatriates in Spain
People from Montevideo